Sharena sol (lit. 'particoloured salt'), also known as colourful salt, is a spice mix used extensively in Bulgarian cuisine. Its most typical ingredients are dried summer savoury, paprika and salt. In addition, dried fenugreek leaves are frequently added and thyme is not uncommon.

References

External links

Herb and spice mixtures
Bulgarian cuisine